Annie Beustes (born 15 June 1945) is a New Caledonian politician. She has served in the Congress of New Caledonia as a member of The Rally–UMP, and is anti-independence; she also served in the government of Jean Lèques.

She served a short term as Vice President of the Government of New Caledonia in August 2007, and was succeeded by Déwé Gorodey of the Kanak and Socialist National Liberation Front (FLNKS: Front de Libération Nationale Kanak et Socialiste).

References

1945 births
Living people
Members of the Congress of New Caledonia
The Rally (New Caledonia) politicians
New Caledonian women in politics
21st-century French women politicians
Vice presidents of the Government of New Caledonia